Jordyn Holzberger (born 27 August 1993) is an Australian field hockey player.

Holzberger was born in Ipswich, Queensland, and made her senior international debut in a test series against Korea in March 2012.

Holzberger was part of the Australian team that won silver at the 2018 Commonwealth Games held in Gold Coast, Australia.

References

External links

1993 births
Living people
Australian female field hockey players
Commonwealth Games medallists in field hockey
Commonwealth Games silver medallists for Australia
Field hockey players at the 2018 Commonwealth Games
20th-century Australian women
21st-century Australian women
Medallists at the 2018 Commonwealth Games